Netzahualcóyotl de la Vega García (18 January 1931 – 6 September 2004) was a Mexican trade union leader and politician affiliated with the Institutional Revolutionary Party. He served as Senator of the LIV, LV and LVIII Legislatures of the Mexican Congress representing Guerrero and as Deputy of the LII and LVI Legislatures.

He was the President of the Chamber of Deputies in 1984 and 1997.

References

1931 births
2004 deaths
Politicians from Guerrero
Mexican trade unionists
Members of the Senate of the Republic (Mexico)
Members of the Chamber of Deputies (Mexico)
Presidents of the Chamber of Deputies (Mexico)
Institutional Revolutionary Party politicians
20th-century Mexican politicians
National Autonomous University of Mexico alumni